Statistics of Swiss Super League in the 1962–63 season.

Overview
There were fourteen teams contesting in the 1962–63 Nationalliga A. These were the top 12 teams from the previous season 1961–62 and the two newly promoted teams Chiasso and Sion. The Championship was played in a double round-robin, the champions were to be qualified for 1963–64 European Cup and the bottom placed two teams in the table were to be relegated. FC Zürich won the championship.

League standings

Results

Topscorers

References

 Summary at RSSSF

Sources
 Switzerland 1962–63 at RSSSF

Swiss Football League seasons
Swiss
1962–63 in Swiss football